DeCarlo is an Italian surname. Notable people with the surname include:

Angelo DeCarlo (1902–1973), American Mafioso
Art DeCarlo (1931–2013), American football player
Dan DeCarlo (1919–2001), American cartoonist
Joe DeCarlo (d. 1928), American bootlegger of the Dallas crime family
Josie DeCarlo (1923–2012),  French-born model and wife of Dan DeCarlo
Mark DeCarlo (born 1962), American actor, television host and comedian
Michael DeCarlo, Canadian television director
Mike DeCarlo (born 1957), American comic book artist
Tommy DeCarlo (born 1965), American singer
Tony DeCarlo (1940 – 2018), American football and wrestling coach

See also

Carlo (name)
De Carlo
DeCaro (disambiguation)
DiCarlo
Inga DeCarlo Fung Marchand birthname of Foxy Brown (rapper)
Thomas DeCarlo Callaway, birthname of CeeLo Green

Italian-language surnames